Valero Rivera may refer to:
Valero Rivera López (1953-), Spanish former handballer and current coach handballer.
Valero Rivera Folch (1985-), Spanish handballer, son of the previous.